Franz Grashof (11 July 1826 – 26 October 1893) was a German engineer. He was a professor of Applied Mechanics at the Technische Hochschule Karlsruhe.

Biography
Born in Düsseldorf, Germany, as the son of Elisabeth Brüggemann and Karl Grashof, who taught at an upper secondary school, Franz Grashof visited the elementary and lower secondary school in Düsseldorf and the industrial school in Hagen.

Motivated by the rise of steamers and the railway, he started working at a locksmith's shop. In October 1844 Franz Grashof quit school to start studying metallurgy at the royal vocational institute in Berlin, where he studied mathematics, physics and mechanical engineering. From 1847 to 1848 he interrupted his studies to voluntarily serve for the military. To serve his country he aimed at becoming a marine officer. Therefore, he had to start working as a simple sailor on a sailing ship called “Esmeralda”. Until December 1851 he sailed around the world and realized that practical work was not his main professional skill. On his journey he decided to teach at a technical school. That's why he carried on studying in Berlin in 1852.
In 1854 Franz Grashof concluded his studies and became a teacher in mathematics and mechanics at the royal vocational institute in Berlin.
In 1855 he got the leadership of the royal gauging office in Berlin. In the following year he was involved in the establishment of the Association of German Engineers and became its managing director until 1890.

From 1863 to 1891 he was a professor of General and Theoretical Machine Science at the Technische Hochschule Karlsruhe. He developed some early steam-flow formulas but made significant contribution to free convection.

On October 26, 1893, he died after his second stroke.

Honors
In Karlsruhe (Germany) on October 26, 1896, a memorial was inaugurated to honor his efforts.
The Grashof Number was named after him. It is a very important dimensionless parameter in analyzing natural or free convection. The Grashof Condition was also named after him. It is a test used often when analysing kinematic chains.

After Grashof's death, the Association of German Engineers (VDI) honored his memory by instituting the Grashof Commemorative Medal as the highest distinction that the society could bestow for merit in the engineering skills.

References

External links
 Franz Grashof at the University of Texas
 Grashof's criterion wiki

1826 births
1893 deaths
Engineers from North Rhine-Westphalia
Academic staff of the Karlsruhe Institute of Technology
Fluid dynamicists